Carlos Baena is a professional animator and now a cofounder of the online school Animation Mentor, which was started in March 2005. It was the first post-secondary school that helped students to pursue a career in animation.  At the school, students work with mentors from major studios in a production-style environment, and graduate with a professional demo reel.

Baena lives in San Francisco, California, where he spends his leisure time studying and making short films, composing music, skateboarding, and working on animation.

Background
Baena was born on in Canary Islands and raised in Madrid, Spain. In 1993, he came to the United States to attend the University of San Francisco and the Academy of Art University. After graduating in June 1998, he found a job animating commercials at Will Vinton Studios in Portland, Oregon. Four months later, he returned to San Francisco to work on spots and short films at Click 3X and WildBrain, Inc. Working on commercials and short films helped him secure a position at San Rafael, CA.-based Industrial Light & Magic (ILM) in March 2001. At (ILM), Baena worked as an animator on Jurassic Park III, Men in Black II, and Star Wars: Episode II – Attack of the Clones.  Eventually, Baena left ILM for Pixar in 2002 where he worked on the films Finding Nemo, The Incredibles, Cars, Ratatouille, WALL-E, and Toy Story 3 as well as the short film Boundin'.

Animation mentor
Baena works with fellow cofounders, Bobby Beck, AnimationMentor.com’s CEO and President, and Shawn Kelly to define and shape the school’s overall direction. Baena balances his co-founder responsibilities with his full-time animator job at Pixar in Emeryville, California.

Awards
In Cars, Baena animated several scenes with the two Italian cars Guido and Luigi and received a 2007 Annie Award nomination for Best Character Animation for his work.

 Premios Fugaz al cortometraje español

The outstanding La Noria has won over 75 awards and has been selected in over 150 festivals.

Filmography

Director
 The Tiger's Apprentice (2023)

Animation Department
 Toy Story 3 (2010) - (animator)
 WALL-E (2008) - (animator)
 Ratatouille (2007) - (animator)
 Boundin' (2003) - (animator)
 Finding Nemo (2003) - (animator)
 Exploring the Reef (2003) - (Video short; animator)
 Hubert's Brain (2001) - (animator)

Visual Effects
 Cars (2006) - (animator)
 The Incredibles (2004) - (animator)
 Men in Black II (2002) - (animator: air chase and post office sequences, ILM)
 Star Wars: Episode II – Attack of the Clones (2002) - (animator: ILM)
 Jurassic Park III (2001) - (CG animator)

References

Further reading
Carlos Baena Interview at CG-Node
Carlos Baena Interview at 3D Total
Carlos Baena Video Interview at Blender Nation

External links
Carlos Baena's Website

Carlos Baena at New York Times
Animation Mentor Website

Year of birth missing (living people)
Living people
University of San Francisco alumni
Spanish emigrants to the United States
American animators
American people of Canarian descent
Academy of Art University alumni
Pixar people
Industrial Light & Magic people